Anna-Lisa (born Anna Lisa Ruud; 30 March 1933 – 21 March 2018) was a Norwegian-born actress who appeared primarily in American films and television series, until she returned to Norway in the early 1970s, where she became a puppeteer.

Early life
Anna-Lisa was born in Oslo, Norway, Anna Lisa Ruud, and worked there at the Central Theater. In 1954, she travelled to the United States to visit her brother, a travel agent in Hollywood.

Career
In the late '50s, she guest-starred in the Western television series Sugarfoot, Maverick, and Bronco, all of which were aired by ABC/Warner Bros. She guest-starred on the 1960 series, The Islanders, an adventure/drama set in the South Pacific, and on Bonanza (episode: "The Savage") and Gunsmoke (episode: "The Blacksmith").

Anna-Lisa then acquired a recurring role as Nora Travers in the ABC Western series Black Saddle, with Peter Breck and Russell Johnson. Her success in Black Saddle resulted in roles in two spaceflight-themed feature films: the 1959 Three Stooges comedy Have Rocket, Will Travel and a year later in 12 to the Moon. She continued to appear in such television series as GE True, hosted by Jack Webb, until she left Hollywood to follow a career on the stage.

She appeared in an episode of The Millionaire in 1959, the episode ".45 Caliber" of Laramie, a 1963 segment of Perry Mason, "The Case of the Velvet Claws" as Norma Vickers, and the 1964 episode "The Village of Guilt" of Voyage to the Bottom of the Sea. Among her last roles in 1966 and 1970, respectively, were as Huldah Swanson and Eleanora in the episodes "The Hat That Huldah Wore" and "The Man Who Planted Gold in California" of the syndicated series Death Valley Days. 

In the early 1970s, she moved back to Norway. From 1976 until she retired from stage in 1995, she was a puppeteer at the Oslo Nye theatre in the Norwegian capital.

Filmography 
 Have Rocket Will Travel (1959) - Three Stooges sci fi movie
 Sea Hunt - season three, episode 23 (1960)
 Bonanza (1960) - Ruth Halversen / White Buffalo Woman in the episode "The Savage"
 Laramie (11-15-60, TV series 2, episode 8) - Louisa in “.45 Caliber”
 12 to the Moon (1960) - Dr. Sigrid Bomark
 77 Sunset Strip (1960-1962, two episodes) - Marie Kosary / Dr. Abby Ryner
 Gunsmoke (1960) - Gretchen Mueller in season six, episode two "The Blacksmith "
 Voyage to the Bottom of the Sea (TV series) - season one (1965) "The Village of Guilt" episode

Death
Anna-Lisa died in Oslo on 21 March 2018, nine days before her 85th birthday.

References

External links

 
 

1933 births
2018 deaths
Actresses from Oslo
20th-century Norwegian actresses
Norwegian puppeteers
Expatriate actresses in the United States
Norwegian stage actresses
Norwegian film actresses
Norwegian expatriates in the United States